El Alamein is a town in the northern Matrouh Governorate of Egypt. , it had a population of 7,397 inhabitants.

The town is located on the site of the ancient city Antiphrai.

Tourism

El Alamein war museum
El Alamein has a war museum with artifacts from North African battles.

Military cemeteries

Germany
There are Italian and German military cemeteries on Tel el-Eisa Hill outside the town. The German cemetery is an ossuary, built in the style of a medieval fortress.

Italy
The Italian cemetery is a mausoleum containing 5,200 tombs. Many tombs bear the soldier's names, with others simply marked IGNOTO, i.e. unknown.

Greek
There is a Greek cemetery at El Alamein.

Commonwealth of Nations
There is a Commonwealth war cemetery, built and maintained by the Commonwealth War Graves Commission, with graves of soldiers from various countries who fought on the Allied side. Buried here are 6,425 identified Commonwealth service personnel, 815 unidentified ones, and 102 of other nationalities. These include four Victoria Cross recipients:
Private Percy Gratwick, Second Australian Imperial Force
Private Arthur Stan Gurney, Second Australian Imperial Force
Sergeant William Bill Kibby, Second Australian Imperial Force
Private Adam Wakenshaw, Durham Light Infantry

Others buried here include:
Squadron Leader George Barclay, Royal Air Force Battle of Britain fighter pilot
Major Henry Rew, Royal Tank Regiment

This has monuments commemorating Greek, New Zealand, Australian, South African, Indian  and Canadian forces. The cemetery entrance is through the Alamein Memorial and there is also a separate Alamein Cremation Memorial to 603 Commonwealth service personnel who died in Egypt and Libya and were cremated in line with their religion.

The names of 213 Canadian airmen appear on the Alamein Memorial in Egypt.

The cemetery was designed by Hubert Worthington.

Climate
El Alamein has a hot desert climate, Köppen climate classification BWh, common with most of the Middle East and North Africa. However, like the rest of the northern coast of Egypt, its climate is slightly less hot, compared to the rest of Egypt, because of the prevailing Mediterranean Sea winds.

World War II

Two important World War II battles were fought in the area:

At the First Battle of El Alamein (1–27 July 1942), the advance of Axis troops on Alexandria was blunted by the Allies, stopping the German  that were trying to outflank the Allies' position.
At the Second Battle of El Alamein (23 October – 4 November 1942), Allied forces broke the Axis line and forced them all the way back to Tunisia. Winston Churchill, the British Prime Minister at the time, said of this victory: "Now this is not the end, it is not even the beginning of the end. But it is, perhaps, the end of the beginning." After the war, he wrote: "Before Alamein we never had a victory. After Alamein, we never had a defeat."

Gallery

See also

 El Alamein Fountain (war memorial commemorating the battle, in Sydney, Australia)
 El Alamein International Airport
 Enham Alamein (village in Hampshire in England, renamed after the battle)
 Marina El Alamein (tourist resort)
 New Alamein

References

External links

 
 

 
Populated coastal places in Egypt
Populated places in Matrouh Governorate
Tourism in Egypt
World War II sites in Egypt